Alek Manolov (born 29 May 1986) is a Bulgarian footballer. He plays for Germanea Sapareva Banya.

Football career
Manolov was a youth player of CSKA Sofia. He began his football career in his local Conegliano German, rebranded as Chernomorets Burgas Sofia in 2006.

Post-retirement
In 2017, he entered the Bulgarian version of The Farm.

References

1986 births
Living people
Bulgarian footballers
First Professional Football League (Bulgaria) players
Association football midfielders
Akademik Sofia players
FC Botev Krivodol players